Saint Nino (sometimes St. Nune or St. Ninny) Equal to the Apostles and the Enlightener of Georgia (c. 296 – c. 338 or 340) was a woman who preached Christianity in the territory of Caucasian Iberia, of what is now part of Georgia. It resulted in the Christianization of the royal house of Iberia, with the consequent Christianization of Iberia.

According to most widely traditional accounts, she belonged to a Greek-speaking Roman family from Kolastra, Cappadocia, was a relative of Saint George, and came to Georgia (ancient Iberia) from Constantinople. Other sources claim she was from Rome, Jerusalem or Gaul (modern France). According to legend, she performed miraculous healings and converted the Georgian queen, Nana, and eventually the pagan king Mirian III of Iberia, who, lost in darkness and blinded on a hunting trip, found his way only after he prayed to "Nino's God". Mirian declared Christianity as the official religion of his kingdom (c. 327) and Nino continued her missionary activities among Georgians until her death.

Her tomb is still shown at the Bodbe Monastery in Kakheti, eastern Georgia. St. Nino has become one of the most venerated saints of the Georgian Orthodox Church and her attribute, a grapevine cross, is a symbol of Georgian Christianity.

Early life
Many sources agree that Nino was born in the small town of Colastri, in the Roman province of Cappadocia, although a smaller number of sources disagree with this. On her family and origin, the Roman Catholic Church and the Eastern Orthodox Church have different traditions.

According to the Eastern Orthodox Church tradition, she was the only child of a famous family. Her father was Roman general Zabulon and her mother Sosana (Susan). On her father's side, Nino was related to St. George, and on her mother's, to the patriarch of Jerusalem, Houbnal I.

During her childhood, Nino was brought up by the nun Niofora-Sarah of Bethlehem. Nino's uncle, who was the patriarch of Jerusalem, oversaw her traditional upbringing. Nino went to Rome with the help of her uncle where she decided to preach the Christian gospel in Iberia, known to her as the resting place of Christ's tunic. According to the legend, Nino received a vision where the Virgin Mary gave her a grapevine cross and said:

"Go to Iberia and tell there the Good Tidings of the Gospel of Jesus Christ, and you will find favour before the Lord; and I will be for you a shield against all visible and invisible enemies. By the strength of this cross, you will erect in that land the saving banner of faith in My beloved Son and Lord."

She woke up from this vision with the cross in her hands, and she tied the cross together with her own hair. Shortly after, Saint Nino entered the Iberian Kingdom in Caucasus from the Kingdom of Armenia, where she escaped persecution at the hands of the Armenian King Tiridates III. She had belonged to a community of virgins numbering 35, along with martyr Hripsime, under the leadership of St. Gayane, who preached Christianity in the Armenian Kingdom. They were all, with the exception of Nino, tortured and beheaded by Tiridates. All 35 of the virgins were soon canonised by the Armenian Apostolic Church, including Nino (as St. Nune).

Contrasting with this, the Roman Catholic tradition, as narrated by Rufinus of Aquileia, says Nino was brought to Iberia not by her own will, but as a slave, and that her family tree is obscure.

St Nino in Iberia

Nino reached the borders of the ancient Georgian Kingdom of Iberia from the south about 320. There she placed a Christian cross in the small town of Akhalkalaki and started preaching the Christian faith in Urbnisi, finally reaching Mtskheta (the capital of Iberia). The Iberian Kingdom had been influenced by the neighbouring Persian Empire which played an important role as the regional power in the Caucasus. The Iberian King Mirian III and his nation worshiped the syncretic gods Armazi and Zaden. Soon after the arrival of Nino in Mtskheta, Nana, the Queen of Iberia requested an audience with the Cappadocian.

Queen Nana, who suffered from a severe illness, had some knowledge of Christianity but had not yet converted to it. Nino, restoring the Queen's health, won to herself disciples from the Queen's attendants, including a Jewish priest and his daughter, Abiathar and Sidonia. Nana also officially converted to Christianity and was baptized by Nino herself. Mirian, aware of his wife's religious conversion, was intolerant of her new faith, persecuting it and threatening to divorce his wife if she did not leave the faith. He secluded himself, however, from Nino and the growing Christian community in his kingdom. His isolation to Christianity did not last long because, according to the legend, while on a hunting trip, he was suddenly struck blind as total darkness emerged in the woods. In a desperate state, King Mirian uttered a prayer to the God of St Nino:

If indeed that Christ whom the Captive had preached to his Wife was God, then let Him now deliver him from this darkness, that he too might forsake all other gods to worship Him.

As soon as he finished his prayer, light appeared and the king hastily returned to his palace in Mtskheta. As a result of this miracle, the King of Iberia renounced idolatry under the teaching of St Nino and was baptized as the first Christian King of Iberia. Soon, the whole of his household and the inhabitants of Mtskheta adopted Christianity. In 326 King Mirian made Christianity the state religion of his kingdom, making Iberia the second Christian state after Armenia.

After adopting Christianity, Mirian sent an ambassador to Byzantium, asking Emperor Constantine I to have a bishop and priests sent to Iberia. Constantine, having learned of Iberia's conversion to Christianity, granted Mirian the new church land in Jerusalem and sent a delegation of bishops to the court of the Georgian King. Roman historian Tyrannius Rufinus in Historia Ecclesiastica writes about Mirian's request to Constantine:

After the church had been built with due magnificence, the people were zealously yearning for God's faith. So an embassy is sent on behalf of the entire nation to the Emperor Constantine, in accordance with the captive woman's advice. The foregoing events are related to him, and a petition submitted, requesting that priests be sent to complete the work which God had begun. Sending them on their way amidst rejoicing and ceremony, the Emperor was far more glad at this news than if he had annexed to the Roman Empire peoples and realms unknown.

In 334, Mirian commissioned the building of the first Christian church in Iberia which was finally completed in 379 on the spot where now stands the Svetitskhoveli Cathedral in Mtskheta.

Nino, having witnessed the conversion of Iberia to Christianity, withdrew to the mountain pass in Bodbe, Kakheti. St Nino died soon after; immediately after her death, King Mirian commenced with the building of monastery in Bodbe, where her tomb can still be seen in the churchyard.

Nino and its variants remains the most popular name for women and girls in the Republic of Georgia. There are currently 88,441 women over age 16 by that name residing in the country, according to the Georgian Ministry of Justice. It also continues to be a popular name for baby girls.

The Georgian name "Nino" is "Nune" or "Nuneh" in Armenian, thus St. Nino is known as St. Nune in Armenia.  Her history as the only one of the 35 nuns of the company of Sts. Gayane and Hripsime to escape the slaughter at the hands of the pagan Armenian King Tiradates III in 301 is recounted in the book The History of the Armenians by Movses Khorenatzi (Moses of Khoren), which was written about the year 440.

Legacy
The Phoka Convent of St. Nino was established in rural Georgia by Abbess Elizabeth and two novices. They originally lived in a nearby house owned by Georgian Orthodox Church head Patriarch Ilia II, then in 1992 moved to the site of an 11th-century church to restore it.

The Sacred Monastery of Saint Nina is the home of a monastic community of Georgian Apostolic Orthodox Christian nuns in the Patriarchate of Georgia's North American Diocese. It is located in Union Bridge, Maryland, USA, and was established in September 2012.

See also
 Georgian Orthodox Church
 Saint Nino, patron saint archive

Notes

Further reading

External links

 Biography from The St. Nina Quarterly
 Life of St Nino
 St. Nino church opening event in NYC
  The Church of St. Nina, Kandalaksha, Murmansk oblast, Russia. English summary

296 births
4th-century deaths
4th-century Christian saints
Cappadocian Greeks
4th-century Roman women
3rd-century Roman women
Christian missionaries in Georgia (country)
Marian visionaries
Saints of Georgia (country)
Miracle workers
Cappadocia (Roman province)